Issam Sartawi (1935 – April 10, 1983) was a senior member of the Palestine Liberation Organization (PLO). He was assassinated on April 10, 1983.

Medical background
Issam Sartawi attended university in Baghdad, graduating in medicine, before specializing in cardiology and getting his MD in the United States.

Politics
Sartawi returned to Palestine in 1967, joined the Fatah movement and helped establish the Palestine Red Crescent Society. He quickly rose to become Yasser Arafat's adviser on Europe and North America. In the mid-1970s he participated with other moderate PLO members to the "Paris meetings" with the Israeli Council for Israeli-Palestinian Peace of general Matti Peled, under the sponsorship of former French Premier Pierre Mendès France. Sartawi and the senior Israeli negotiator, Aryeh "Lova" Eliav, jointly received the Austrian Kreisky prize in 1979 for seeking an end to the Arab-Israeli conflict.  The meetings between the PLO and the Israel-Palestine Peace Council were detailed in the book 'My Friend, the Enemy' by the Israeli peace activist Uri Avnery who was one of the negotiators. Avnery later wrote in CounterPunch that Sartawai once told him that a French antisemitic leader came to his office in Paris and offered an alliance and that he threw him out; Avnery recalled that Sartawi said "the anti-Semites are the greatest enemies of the Palestinian people".

Sartawi disagreed with Arafat's rejection of Ronald Reagan's peace plan proposal of September 1982, according to which Palestinians on the West Bank and in Gaza would govern themselves for a five-year period, and then engage in negotiations for an Israeli withdrawal, and, eventually a Palestinian-Jordanian state. Sartawi thought that under Arafat the Palestinian National Council was refusing to be realistic, and that it should have accepted the positive points in Reagan's proposal. He rejected as wishful thinking attempts to interpret the recent defeat in Lebanon in 1982 as a victory, remarking: "Another victory like this and the PLO will find itself in the Fiji Islands." His position found scarce support, and when Arafat barred him from speaking before the PNC, he put in his resignation. Arafat twice refused to accept Sartawi's resignation.

Assassination
In February 1983, Portuguese socialist leader Mário Soares formally invited the PLO to send an observer to the April 1983 congress of the Socialist International in Sydney. The passionately pro-Israeli Australian Labour prime minister, Bob Hawke, strongly objected to the PLO's invitation; and the SI congress was hurriedly relocated to Albufeira, Portugal. Sartawi was selected by the PLO as its representative at this meeting in Portugal. Because the SI counted both the Israeli Labor Party and the PLO as members, it was hoped that such a meeting could promote the Middle Eastern peace process.  

On April 10, 1983, Sartawi was shot and killed in the lobby of the Montechoro Hotel in Albufeira, Portugal. The gunman escaped. Sartawi's assassination (later claimed by the Abu Nidal Organization) was witnessed by SI secretary-general, Bernt Carlsson, and was assumed to have been carried out so as to frustrate Carlsson's peace efforts. Sartawi's funeral took place in Amman and was attended by all factions of the PLO – even including Abu Nidal Organization members (according to Maxim Ghilan, founder of the International Jewish Peace Union).

Memorial
In 1998, the Issam Sartawi Center for the Advancement of Peace and Democracy (ISCAPD) was established at the Al-Quds University (the Arab University in Jerusalem) in memory of Sartawi. In 1999, Portuguese author André Neves Bento wrote a detailed account of Issam Sartawi's assassination. During his investigations, Bento found transfers from a bank account in the name of Samir Najem A-Din, portrayed in the Western press as one of the leading PLO money men, from which account money was taken for a variety of purposes. On 13 March 1984, less than one year of Sartawi's assassination, for example, the owner of the account instructed the bank to transfer $17,000 to the Dafex arms factory in Portugal. A directive given by Najem A-din to the bank was also discovered, in which he orders the monthly transfer of 10,000 pounds to the account of Amin Al-Banna, apparently the cousin of Abu Nidal. Al-Banna is suspected of involvement in the murder of Issam Sartawi, Arafat's political adviser.

See also
List of unsolved murders

References

1935 births
1983 deaths
1983 murders in Portugal
Assassinated Palestinian politicians
Deaths by firearm in Portugal
Fatah members
Palestinian people murdered abroad
People from Sarta
People from Acre, Israel
People murdered in Portugal
Unsolved murders in Portugal